The Chinese city of Chongqing has a history dating back at least 3,000 years.

Prehistory
Evidence of human activity in Chongqing has been discovered dating back to the Old Stone Age, approximately 20–30,000 years ago. The fossils of a lower jawbone and teeth of an extinct non-hominin ape discovered near Wushan County in 1985 was originally thought to be a 2-million-year-old primitive human known as Wushan Man. This theory, originally proposed by Russell Ciochon, was reversed by the same scientist 15 years later – as it would have voided the "Recent African origin of modern humans" hypothesis.

Pre-unification
At the beginning of the Zhou dynasty in the 11th century BCE, the State of Ba was formed by the population of eastern Sichuan. However, this was no more than a loose confederation of independent clans which recognised a single king. During the Warring States period, the State of Ba fell into decline, until it was absorbed by the State of Qin in 316 BCE. It is unknown why the State of Ba fell so quickly into decline, but it is thought that due to a lack of unity, a powerful army could not be raised, leaving it open to attack by invaders.

Imperial history
At different times throughout its history, Chongqing was known by several different names, including Jiangzhou, Ba Prefecture, Chu Prefecture (420–581), Yu Prefecture and Gong Prefecture (during the Northern Song Dynasty). In 1189 CE, the area was renamed Chongqing Fu by Emperor Guangzong (then called Prince Gong). Chongqing (literally, 'redoubled celebration') was renamed as such by Emperor Guangzong as he was promoted from the ruler of a Zhou to a Fu (area of special importance) and also promoted from the position of a prince to Emperor Guangzong of the Song Dynasty in the same year, hence the term 'redoubled celebration'.

The Ming and Qing dynasties saw a period of rapid economic growth for the city as merchants gathered there from all over China. In 1891, the city's port was made open to the outside world, and a customs house was set up. In 1929, Chongqing was formally declared a city.

Modern times
After the outbreak of the Second Sino-Japanese War in 1937, the Kuomintang moved its seat of government from Nanjing to Chongqing. In 1939 the city was made a municipality under the Executive Yuan and in 1940 was made the provisional wartime capital of China. Chongqing endured years of intensive daytime and nighttime bombings by massed formations of Imperial Japanese Naval and Army Air Forces in the Battles of Chongqing and Chengdu; battles which were fought entirely by opposing air forces and anti-aircraft defenses. In 1946, the seat of government was moved back to Nanjing. After the founding of the People's Republic of China in 1949, Chongqing remained the cultural and economic centre of southwestern China. In 1983, the economic reforms effected by Deng Xiaoping were trialled in the city. In 1997 Chongqing became the one of four municipalities directly under the central government in China, and the only one in western China.

A drought affected the area in the Summer of 2022, with the Yangtse River dropping to levels unseen in decades if not centuries. It was accompanied by a sustained heatwave with temperatures up to 45ºC and remaining in the high 30s overnight, with the city becoming at the forefront of an unrelenting heatwave across a large part of the Chinese mainland, including the Sichuan Basin.

See also
 History of China

References